The 1956 CCCF Youth Championship was an age restricted association football competition organised by the CCCF (English: Football Confederation of Central America and the Caribbean). All games were hosted in San Salvador and took place in December.

See also
Football competitions in El Salvador
Football in Central America

References 

Under-19 association football competitions
1956 in youth association football